My Name Is Barbra is a 1965 television special and the first for up and coming super star Barbra Streisand. The special was broadcast April 28, 1965 on CBS in conjunction with Streisand's fifth studio album My Name Is Barbra. The special was very successful, won many awards, including five Emmys and a contract was signed for another four specials. The special was split into three acts. To promote the album My Name Is Barbra, Two... and the rerun of the TV special, Columbia planned a major advertising and promotion campaign which include full-page advertising in TV Guide and Esquire magazines, saturation radio spot in 30 major markets, retailers supplied with 38-inch die-cuts, streamers and pre-pack counter browsers and 800 transportation display locations with four-sheet posters to draw attention to both the album and the TV special.

Act one
 My Name is Barbra
 Much More
 I'm Late
 Make Believe
 How Does the Wine Taste
 A Kid Again
 I'm Five
 Sweet Zoo
 Where Is The Wonder?
 People

Act two
 I've Got The Blues
 Monologue
 Second Hand Rose
 Give Me the Simple Life
 I Got Plenty o' Nuttin'
 Brother, Can You Spare a Dime?
 Nobody Knows You When You're Down and Out
 The Best Things in Life are Free

Act three
 When The Sun Comes Out
 Why Did I Choose You?
 Lover, Come Back to Me
 I Am Woman
 Don't Rain On My Parade
 The Music That Makes Me Dance
 My Man
 Happy Days Are Here Again

Critical acclaim
Barbra Streisand received all positive reviews. The United Press International proclaimed "She is so great it is shocking. She may well be the most supremely talented and complete popular entertainer that this country has ever produced."

The show was the 16th top ranked show in the Nielsen ratings report for April 26-May 9, 1965.

Awards
My Name Is Barbra was nominated for six Primetime Emmy Awards in 1965, for which it won five. Streisand won the award for "Outstanding Individual Achievements in Entertainment." It also won the Directors Guild of America Award for "Outstanding Directorial Achievement in Television" in 1966.

Barbra Streisand also won her first Peabody Award in 1965.

Certifications

References

External links
 

1960s American television specials
1965 in American television
1965 television specials
CBS television specials
Music television specials
Peabody Award-winning broadcasts
Barbra Streisand
Television shows directed by Dwight Hemion